The Breeders' Cup Distaff is a Weight for Age Thoroughbred horse race for fillies and mares, 3 years old and up. Known as the Breeders' Cup Ladies' Classic between 2008 and 2012, it is held annually at a different racetrack in the United States or Canada as part of the Breeders' Cup World Championships. It is the top ranked race for fillies and mares in North America, and often decides the title for champion three-year-old and / or champion older filly or mare.

Starting with the 2008 Breeders' Cup, the Distaff was the final race on the first day (Friday) of the two-day event. In 2018, it was returned to the Saturday card.

Distance : 1 miles (1984–1987); 1 miles (1988 to present).

Automatic berths 
In 2007, the Breeders' Cup developed the Breeders' Cup Challenge, a series of races in each division that allots automatic qualifying bids to winners of defined races. Each of the fourteen divisions has multiple qualifying races. Note though that one horse may win multiple challenge races, while other challenge winners will not be entered in the Breeders' Cup for a variety of reasons such as injury or travel considerations.

In the Distaff division, runners are limited to 14 and there are up to four automatic berths. The 2022 "Win and You're In" races were:
 Gran Premio Criadores, a Group 1 race run in May at Hipódromo Argentino de Palermo in Argentina
 Ogden Phipps Stakes, a Grade 1 race run in June at Belmont Park in New York
 Clement L. Hirsch Handicap, a Grade 1 race run in August at Del Mar Racetrack in California
 Spinster Stakes, a Grade 1 race at Keeneland Race Course in Kentucky

Records
Most wins:
 2 – Bayakoa (ARG) (1989, 1990)
 2 – Royal Delta (2011, 2012)
 2 – Beholder (2013, 2016)
 2 - Monomoy Girl (2018, 2020)

Stakes record:
Not applicable, as the race is run at different tracks

Most wins by a jockey:
 5 – Mike Smith (1995, 1997, 2002, 2008, 2012)

Most wins by a trainer:
 5 – William I. Mott (1997, 1998, 2010, 2011, 2012)

Most wins by an owner:
 3 – Allen Paulson (1997, 1998, 2002)

Winners of the Breeders' Cup Distaff 

† – 1984, 1985, 1986, 1987 races were run at 1 miles

See also
 Breeders' Cup Distaff "top three finishers" and starters
 American thoroughbred racing top attended events

References

External links
Official Breeders' Cup website
Ten Things You Should Know about the Breeders' Cup Ladies Classic at Hello Race Fans!
Three Great Moments: Breeders' Cup Distaff at Hello Race Fans!

Distaff
Mile category horse races for fillies and mares
Grade 1 stakes races in the United States
Horse races in the United States
Recurring sporting events established in 1984
1984 establishments in California